is a subway station on the Tokyo Metro Chiyoda Line in Chiyoda, Tokyo, Japan, operated by Tokyo Metro. Its station number is C-12.

Adjacent stations on the Chiyoda Line are Otemachi (C-11) and Yushima Station (C-13). Transfers are also possible to Awajicho Station (M-19) on the Tokyo Metro Marunouchi Line and Ogawamachi Station (S-07) on the Toei Shinjuku Line. East Japan Railway Company (JR East) Ochanomizu Station on the Chūō and the Chūō-Sōbu Lines lie above it at ground level.

Station layout
The station consists of one island platform serving two tracks.

Platforms

History
The station opened on December 20, 1969.

Following the privatization of the Teito Rapid Transit Authority (TRTA) in 2004, the station was inherited by the Tokyo Metro on 1 April 2004.

PASMO smart card coverage at this station began operation on 18 March 2007.

Surrounding area
Shin-ochanomizu Station is convenient for passengers traveling to and from a number of places:
Sundai Yobigakkō
Hitachi Seisakusho
Kanda Myōjin Shrine
Akihabara
Yushima Seidō Confucian temple
Holy Resurrection Cathedral (Nicholai-dō)
Tokyo Medical University
Tokyo Medical University Hospital
Juntendo University (medical department)
Juntendo University Medical Department Hospital
Meiji University (Headquarters and Surugadai Campus)
Nihon University (Department of Dentistry, Engineering, Graduate Law Research)
Surugadai Nihon University Hospital and related facilities
Nihon University Casals Hall
Chuo University Surugadai Memorial Hall
Hilltop (Yamanoue) Hotel
Tokyo YWCA Hall
Kanda used-book district
Kanda River
Hijiri Bridge
Hongō-dōri
Meiji-dōri
Sotobori-dōri
Route 17

References

External links 

 Station website (in English)

Railway stations in Japan opened in 1969
Railway stations in Tokyo
Tokyo Metro Chiyoda Line
Kanda, Tokyo